This is a list of the current and past directors of the National Intelligence Service of South Korea and its predecessor organisations, the Korean Central Intelligence Agency and the Agency for National Security Planning.

References 

 National Intelligence Service: Past Directors

 
D